The Diplomatic School of Spain (Escuela Diplomática in Spanish) is an official institution dependent on the Spanish Ministry of Foreign Affairs and Cooperation. It was constituted in 1942 and is located in Madrid.

Master course 
Its main mission is training new Spanish diplomats as civil servants. It also focuses on the training of officials serving abroad and those aspiring to a career in international civil service, among other functions. The Master's degree course in international relations is offered in collaboration with the mainstream Spanish universities, among them the Complutense University of Madrid. Previously the master's degree was titled Curso de Estudios Internacionales, or Course of International Studies, which brings together both Spanish and foreign students in the fields of diplomacy, and imparts a general education focused on international law and international relations.

Admission to the master's degree programme is based on a competitive exam which assesses the candidates knowledge of international relations. There is no fixed syllabus for this exam, rather the questions are based on international affairs at the date of the exam.

Courses 
The Diplomatic School of Spain offersthe following courses, apart from the selective course for civil servants in diplomatic career:

 European Union course (Diploma in European Communities).
 Protocol course in collaboration with the University of Oviedo and the School of Public Administration of the Generalitat de Catalunya, or Government of Catalonia, directed by Felio A. Vilarrubias.
 Islam course.
 Human rights.

Each year, the Kings of Spain attend the commencement ceremony together with the Minister of Foreign Affairs.

Directors 
Directors of the Diplomatic School since 1942:

 Emilio de Palacios y Fau (1942-1946)
 José María Doussinague y Teixidor (1946-1949)
 Juan Francisco de Cárdenas y Rodríguez de Rivas (1950-1957)
 Cristóbal del Castillo and Campos (1957-1958)
 Emilio de Navasqüés y Ruiz de Velasco, Conde de Navasqüés (1950-1972)
 Juan José Rovira y Sánchez-Herrero (1973-1974)
 Gonzalo Fernández de la Mora y Mon (1976)
 José Antonio Giménez-Arnau y Gran (1976-1979)
 José María Moro Martín-Montalvo (1979-1983)
 Juan Ignacio Tena Ybarra (1983-1985)
 Miguel Ángel Ochoa Brun (1985-1991)
 Ramón Armengod López (1991-1994)
 José Coderch Planas (1994-1996)
 Mariano Ucelay de Montero (1996-1999)
 José María Velo de Antelo (1999-2002)
 María Isabel Vicandi Plaza (2002-2003)
 Antonio Cosano Pérez (2003-2004)
 Andrés Collado González (2004-2007)
 Ignacio Sagaz Temprano (2007-2009)
 José Antonio Martínez from Villareal Baena (2009-2012)
 José Luis de la Peña Vela (2012-

Student body 
Among former students, the following personalities stand out:

Foreign Affairs and Cooperation 
 Miguel Ángel Moratinos, Minister (2004-2010)
 Carlos Westendorp, Minister (1995-1996)
 Fernando Morán, Minister (1982-1985)
 Jonathan Delgado, Foreign Affairs Counselor and Consul General 
 Dita Charanzová, Member of the European Parliament (2014 - )
 Mami Mizutori, United Nations Office for Disaster Risk Reduction (2016 - )
People's Party (Spain)
 Gustavo de Arístegui, deputy
 Jorge Moragas, deputy
 Vicente Blanco Gaspar, ambassador and writer 

Literature
 Santiago de Mora-Figueroa y Williams, Marquess of Tamarón, writer, former ambassador of Spain in United Kingdom and former Director of the Cervantes Institute
 Fernando Schwartz, novelist 
 José María Ridao, writer and journalist
 Father Apeles, or José-Apeles Santolaria de Puey y Cruells, lawyer and journalist
 Isabel Sartorius, aristocrat.

Juristic interpreters 
At its headquarters, the annual exams of Juristic Interpreters take place, by the Office of jurors, the Ministry of Foreign Affairs.

Others 
The Spanish Association of Professors of International Law and International Relations (Asociación Española de Profesores de Derecho Internacional y Relaciones Internacionales = AEPDIRI) and the Spanish Commission for Cooperation with UNESCO have their headquarters. There is also the Asociación de antiguos alumnos de la Escuela diplomática (Association of former students of the Diplomatic School.)

References

External links

Foreign relations of Spain
1942 establishments in Spain
Educational institutions established in 1942